Slobodan Trninić (born 14 January 1953) is a Croatian cinematographer.

Trninić graduated from the University of Zagreb Academy of Drama Arts in 1979, and his first feature film was the 1991 Yugoslav film Virgina, directed by Serbian director Srđan Karanović.

That same year Trninić shot Rajko Grlić's film Charuga, and in 1993 he shot The Golden Years (directed by Davor Žmegač), a drama for which he won the Golden Arena for Best Cinematography at the 1993 Pula Film Festival, the Croatian national film awards.

He continued to work with a number of films in Croatia and abroad, and in 2010 he won his second Golden Arena for his work on Just Between Us (directed by Rajko Grlić).

Selected filmography
Charuga (Čaruga, 1991; directed by Rajko Grlić)
Virgina (Virdžina, 1991; directed by Srđan Karanović)
The Golden Years (Zlatne godine, 1993; directed by Davor Žmegač)
Putovanje tamnom polutkom, 1995; directed by Davor Žmegač)
Tranquilizer Gun (Puška za uspavljivanje, 1997; directed by Hrvoje Hribar)
Dubrovnik Twilight (Dubrovački suton, 1999; directed by Željko Senečić)
Je li jasno, prijatelju?, 2000; directed by Dejan Aćimović)
Josephine, 2002; directed by Rajko Grlić)
The Sunken Cemetery (Potonulo groblje, 2002, directed by Mladen Juran)
Horseman (Konjanik, 2003; directed by Branko Ivanda)
Summer in the Golden Valley (Ljeto u zlatnoj dolini, 2003; directed by Srđan Vuletić)
The Border Post (Karaula, 2006; directed by Rajko Grlić)
It's Hard to be Nice (Teško je biti fin, 2007; directed by Srđan Vuletić)
No One's Son (Ničiji sin, 2008; directed by Arsen Anton Ostojić)
Just Between Us (Neka ostane među nama, 2010; directed by Rajko Grlić)
Halima's Path (Halimin put, 2012)

References

External links

Slobodan Trninić biography at Filmski-Programi.hr 

1953 births
Living people
People from Banja Luka
Croatian cinematographers
Golden Arena winners